Pitcairnia xanthocalyx is a plant species in the genus Pitcairnia. This species is endemic to Mexico.

Hybrids
 Pitcairnia 'Borincana' (Pitcairnia angustifolia X Pitcairnia xanthocalyx)
 Pitcairnia 'Mexican Blondes' (Pitcairnia chiapensis X Pitcairnia xanthocalyx)
 Pitcairnia 'Pinot Noir' (Pitcairnia rubronigriflora X Pitcairnia xanthocalyx)

References

BSI Cultivar Registry Retrieved 11 October 2009

xanthocalyx
Endemic flora of Mexico